Baby Stafford (born Stephen Stafford) is a musician and founder member of the band 'Baby Stafford'. He originally played in the Scottish rock band Gun in the late 1980s. Gun went on to support The Rolling Stones on tour.

Biography
On leaving Gun Stafford went on to form the band 'Raindog'.  However, this clashed with the name of an existing band, and after using several different names (including 'Kate' and 'Babylon Drive'), the guitarist came under record company and management pressure to use his own nickname for recording and playing live. Initially the band 'Baby Stafford' was composed of Stafford on lead guitar and vocals, Paul Roden (ex-'Wild River Apples') on bass, and fellow former Gun member Scott Shields on drums. The band signed to EMI and Buddy Rennie completed the band's line-up as rhythm guitarist. In 1994, the band toured as support act to both Skin and Gun. The band released an EP, Paper Love Maker and recorded an album, but it was never released and the band was subsequently dropped by the record label.

In 1997, Stafford was playing in the band 'Breaker', fronted by ex-MTV VJ Rebecca de Ruvo.  Breaker released an album called Dislocated on the Coalition label, which was preceded by a 5-track CD sampler and three singles, "Strange Love", "Stereotype" and "Modern Times".  On Breaker's 'Strange Love' EP, Stafford is credited with contributing "additional guitars" and is featured on the CD's artwork.

Stafford was influenced by guitarists such as Keith Richards, Angus Young and Jimmy Page. He no longer goes under the name 'Baby' but as 'Stephen'.

Discography
 Paper Love Maker EP (EMI-1994)

References

External links 
 Gun fan site

Year of birth missing (living people)
Living people
Scottish rock musicians